Ram Swaroop Prasad was an Indian politician who served as Member of 14th Lok Sabha and 9th Lok Sabha from Nalanda Lok Sabha constituency. He is also the winner of 1972 Bihar Legislative Assembly election from Ekangarsara Assembly constituencyi and 1985 Bihar Legislative Assembly election and October 2005 Bihar Legislative Assembly election from Islampur Assembly constituency.

Personal life 
He was born on 5 January 1935 in Nalanda district and married Sunaina Devi on 1 January 1951. In 2015, he died by getting Heart attack at the age of 82.

References

External links
Official biographical sketch in Parliament of India website

Indian politicians
1935 births
2015 deaths
Lok Sabha members from Bihar
India MPs 1989–1991
India MPs 2004–2009